This article describes those aspects of the phonological history of the English language which concern consonants.

Consonant clusters

H-cluster reductions
 Reduction of /hl/, /hr/ and /hn/, with the loss of the initial  in Middle English.
 Reduction of /hj/ to /j/ in a few American and Irish dialects (so that hew is pronounced like yew).

Y-cluster reductions

Other initial cluster reductions
 Reduction of /wr/ to /r/, in words like wrap, around the 17th century (there was also a reduction of /wl/ to /l/ in Middle English).
 Reduction of /kn/ and /ɡn/ to /n/, in words like knot and gnome, around the 17th century.
 S-cluster reduction, in some types of Caribbean English, where for example spit is pronounced pit.

Final cluster reductions
 Generalized final cluster reduction in African American Vernacular English (AAVE) and Caribbean English, where for example desk and hand may be pronounced "dess" and "han".

Other changes involving clusters
 Reduction of /ts/ to /s/ – a Middle English reduction that produced the modern sound of soft .
 Medial cluster reduction – elision of certain stops in medial clusters, such as the /t/ in postman.
 Insertion (epenthesis) of stops after nasals in certain clusters, for example making prince sound like prints, and dreamt rhyme with attempt.
 Assimilation of certain consonants in clusters, especially nasals.
 Glottalization and pre-glottalization (insertion of a glottal stop in place of or before a /t/ or other stop) in certain environments, depending on dialect.
 Certain other changes occurring in AAVE, including S-cluster metathesis (as with the use of "aks" for ask – an alternation which also has a long history in general forms of English), the merger of /str/ and /skr/, and yod-rhotacization (where beautiful is pronounced "brootiful").

Stops

Aspiration
The voiceless stops /p/, /t/, /k/ are typically aspirated when they begin a stressed syllable, becoming , as described under English phonology (obstruents). There is some regional variation in the degree of aspiration, and in some Scottish and northern English accents aspiration does not occur at all.

In certain accents, such as Geordie (among younger women) and in some speakers of Dublin English, /p/, /t/ and /k/ can be preaspirated when they come at the end of a word or utterance, becoming .

Flapping

Flapping, or tapping, is a process whereby /t/ or /d/ is pronounced as the alveolar flap  in certain positions, especially between vowels (but also sometimes after other sonorants). It may be perceived as, for example, the pronunciation of butter as "budder". It occurs especially in North American English (to varying extents) and in Australian and New Zealand English.

Voicing
Apart from the T-voicing that results from flapping (described above), some dialects feature other instances of voicing or lenition of the stops /p/, /t/ and /k/. In Geordie, these stops may be fully voiced ([b], [d], [ɡ]) in intervocalic position. In Devon, stops and other obstruents may be voiced (or at least lenited) between vowels and when final after a weak vowel, so for example the /k/ and /t/ in jacket may approach the realizations [ɡ] and [d], making the word sound similar or identical to jagged.

Glottalization
Stops, chiefly the voiceless stops, and especially /t/, are frequently glottalized or pre-glottalized in certain positions; that is, a stop may be replaced with the glottal stop , or else a glottal stop may be inserted before it. These phenomena are strongly dependent on the phonetic environment and on dialect. For details, see T-glottalization, as well as English phonology (obstruents) and glottalization in consonant clusters.

If all final voiceless stops are glottalized, as may occur in some London speech, then sets of words such as lick, lit and lip may become homophones, pronounced .

Fricatives and affricates

H-dropping and H-insertion

H-dropping is the omission of initial  in words like house, heat and hangover. It is common in many dialects, especially in England, Wales, Australia and Jamaica, but is generally stigmatized, and is not a feature of the standard accents. The /h/ is nonetheless frequently dropped in all forms of English in the weak forms of function words like he, him, her, his, had and have. The opposite of H-dropping, called H-insertion or H-adding, may arise as a hypercorrection by typically H-dropping speakers, or as a spelling pronunciation.

Loss of velar and palatal fricatives
Their loss was accompanied by certain changes in the previous vowels. In some cases [x] became /f/, as in laugh.

A /x/ is still heard in words of the above type in certain Scots and northern English traditional dialect speech. A /x/ is more commonly heard, especially in the Celtic countries but also for many speakers elsewhere, in the word loch and in certain proper names such as Buchan.

For details of the above phenomena, see H-loss (Middle English). See also the vocalization of the voiced velar fricative .

Voiced/voiceless splits
The Old English fricatives  had voiceless and voiced allophones, the voiced forms occurring in certain environments, such as between vowels. In Early Middle English, partly by borrowings from French, they split into separate phonemes: . See Middle English phonology – Voiced fricatives.

Also in the Middle English period, the voiced affricate  took on phonemic status. (In Old English, it is considered to have been an allophone of /j/). It occurred in Middle English not only in words like brigge ("bridge") in which it had been present in Old English but also in French loanwords like juge ("judge") and general.

After the Middle English period, a fourth voiced fricative, developed as a phoneme (alongside the voiceless ). It arose from yod-coalescence in words like measure, and from late French loanwords like rouge and beige.

Dental fricatives

As noted above, the Old English phoneme  split into two phonemes in early Middle English: a voiceless dental fricative  and a voiced dental fricative . Both continued to be spelt .

Certain English accents feature variant pronunciations of these sounds. These include fronting, where they merge with /f/ and /v/ (found in Cockney and some other dialects); stopping, where they approach /t/ and /d/ (as in some Irish speech); alveolarisation, where they become  (in some African varieties); and debuccalisation, where  becomes  before a vowel (found in some Scottish English).

Initial fricative voicing

(Words beginning , like three, develop /dr/ instead.) The phenomenon is well known as a stereotypical feature, but is now rare in actual speech. Some such pronunciations have spread from these dialects to become standard usage: the words vane, vat and vixen all had initial /f/ in Old English (fana, fæt, fyxen).

A similar phenomenon occurred in both German and Dutch.

Other changes
 The labiodental fricative /v/ is sometimes merged with the corresponding bilabial stop /b/. The distinction of /v/ from /b/ is one of the last phonological distinctions commonly learnt by English-speaking children generally, and pairs like dribble/drivel may be pronounced similarly even by adults.
 In Indian English, /v/ is often pronounced like /w/, sounded as [w] or as a labiodental approximant . For , see th-stopping.
 For some speakers of Mexican American English, initial  and  may be used in place of each other, so jet may be pronounced as yet or vice versa.
 In Indian South African English, the typical realization of the labiodental fricatives  are the approximants .

Approximants

Insertion and deletion of /j/ and /w/ 
In parts of the west and southwest of England, initial /w/ may be dropped in words like wool and woman; occasionally, though, a /w/ may be inserted before certain vowels, as in "wold" for old and "bwoiling" for boiling. Similarly, initial /j/ may be lost in words like yeast and yes (this has also been reported in parts of eastern England), and may be added in words like earth (making "yearth").

For the much more widespread deletion of /j/ in consonant clusters, see yod-dropping  (and compare also yod-coalescence and yod-rhotacization). For the historical loss of /w/ in such words as who and write, see pronunciation of wh and reduction of /wr/.

Realizations of /r/

Old and Middle English /r/ was historically pronounced as an alveolar trill, [r]. At some time between later Middle English and Early Modern English, it changed to an alveolar approximant, in the standard accents. Some Scottish speakers, however, retain the original trilled ("rolled") /r/.

Another possible realization of /r/ is the alveolar tap, . This is common (alongside ) in Scotland, and is also found in certain other accents, chiefly in positions between vowels or between a consonant and a vowel – this occurs, for example, in some Liverpool English and in some upper-class RP (this should not be confused with the tap pronunciation of /t/ and /d/, found especially in North America).

In most General American, /r/ is  before a vowel, but when not followed by a vowel is generally realized as an r-colored vowel, [ɚ], or as r-coloring on the preceding vowel. In many accents of English, including RP, /r/ is lost altogether when not followed by a vowel – for this, see rhoticity in English (and for related phenomena, linking and intrusive R). For vowel changes before /r/, see English-language vowel changes before historic /r/.

A uvular realization of /r/, the "Northumbrian burr", is used by some speakers in the far north of England.
 
A relatively recent innovation in the southeast of England, possibly originating from Cockney, is the use of a labiodental approximant, for /r/.

Developments involving /l/ 

Velarization of /l/ in positions where there is no vowel following, producing a "dark L", is a phenomenon that goes back to Old English times. Today there is much variation between dialects as regards the degree and distribution of this velarization; see English phonology (sonorants).

This affected:
The resulting diphthongs developed respectively into modern  in words like all, ball, call, and into the  vowel in words like poll, scroll and control. Some words of more recent origin did not undergo these changes, such as pal, doll and alcohol; the word shall is also unaffected.
Words in the second set, having the  vowel, include old, cold and bolt (though some RP speakers also have  in words like bolt). The word solder has a variety of pronunciations; in North America the /l/ is often dropped.
 Words with /alk/ and /olk/, which again followed the same pattern, but also dropped the /l/, so that words like chalk, talk and walk now have , while folk and yolk rhyme with smoke.
 Words with /alm/ and /olm/, which lost the /l/ and lengthened the vowel (the lengthened  later becoming diphthongized in  the toe–tow merger). Words like alms, balm, calm, Chalmers, qualm, palm and psalm now generally have  in the standard accents, while holm and Holmes are homophones of home(s). The word salmon generally retains a short vowel despite the loss of /l/.
Words like scalp and Alps are unaffected.

As noted under some of the points above, /l/ may be reintroduced in some of the words from which it has been lost, as a spelling pronunciation.

The /l/ has also been lost in the words would and should. The word could was never pronounced with /l/; its spelling results from analogy with the former words.

Modern L-vocalization (the replacement of "dark" /l/ with a non-syllabic vowel sound, usually similar to [ʊ] or [o]) is a feature of certain accents, particularly in London English and in near-RP speech that has been influenced by it ("Estuary English"), in some New York and Philadelphia speech, in the American South and African American Vernacular English, and according to some reports in New Zealand English.

In some accents around Bristol, "intrusive L" is found, where an /l/ is inserted at the end of words ending in schwa, like comma and idea. This is now somewhat stigmatized, but far from rare. The name Bristol itself was formerly Bristow.

In some modern English accents, significant pre-L breaking occurs when /l/ follows certain vowels (and diphthongs ending  or ). Here the vowel develops a centering offglide (an additional schwa) before the /l/. This may cause reel to be pronounced like real, and tile, boil and fowl to rhyme with dial, royal and vowel. Wells considers this breaking to be a feature of Midwestern and New York English. Similar pre-L schwa-insertion may also occur after  (in rhotic accents), leading to pronunciations like  for world.

Sound changes involving final consonants

Final obstruent devoicing
Final obstruent devoicing is the full devoicing of final obstruents that occurs for some AAVE speakers in Detroit where obstruents are devoiced at the end of a word.

Most varieties of English do not have full devoicing of final voiced obstruents, but voiced obstruents are partially devoiced in final position in English, especially when they are phrase-final or when they are followed by a voiceless consonant (for example, bad cat ).

Final consonant deletion
Final consonant deletion is the nonstandard deletion of single consonants in syllable-final position occurring for some AAVE speakers resulting in pronunciations like:

 bad - 
 con - 
 foot - 
 five - 
 good - 

When final nasal consonants are deleted, the nasality is maintained on the preceding vowel. When voiced stops are deleted, the length of the preceding vowel is maintained. Consonants remaining from reduced final clusters may be eligible for deletion. The deletion occurs especially if the final consonant is a nasal or a stop. Final-consonant deletion is much less frequent than the more common final-cluster reduction.

Consonants can also be deleted at the end of a morpheme boundary, leading to pronunciations like  for kids.

Other changes

merger

See also
 Phonological history of the English language
 Phonological history of English vowels
 Rhotic and non-rhotic accents
 L-vocalization
 Phonological history of wh

References

Bibliography 

 
 Wells, John C. (1982), Accents of English (3 vols.), Cambridge University Press.

English phonology

Scottish English
Germanic language histories